Mach One are a British neo-progressive rock band, founded in 1980 by a group of students attending Burlington Danes High School in West London.  After a series of studio demos, school gigs and lineup changes, the band attracted the attention of Keith Goodwin (notable as publicist for Yes, Rod Argent, Black Sabbath, in the 1970s, and Marillion in the 1980s) who represented them through 1983-85.  During this time Mach One embarked on a series of live shows at pubs and clubs around London, and universities across England, while releasing two albums, Six of One and Lost for Words, that featured prominently in underground progressive rock fanzines (such as the Genesis Fanzine called Afterglow) and specialist progressive rock catalogues.  However, in the more mainstream press they received mixed reviews for their second album, including a humorous 1-star review by Mary Anne Hobbs in Sounds (a British music paper), although their live show was given a positive write-up in the same paper a few weeks thereafter by journalist Gareth Thompson.

In 1984 they established a residency at The Cafe Emil in Kensington, London, one of the few places where they regularly sold out.  Any success beyond this eluded them, and when Pinnacle Records, their main distribution company, declared bankruptcy the band decided to call it a day.

However, the band did reform briefly in 1985 as a smaller three-piece to record material for a new concept album titled Could This Have Been Our Prehistory.  Although this has yet to be released officially, they did play the whole album live in its entirety at a few gigs in London but there was no plans to continue beyond that.  Later that summer they were asked to play a last minute support gig at London's famous Marquee Club but it was the last time they were ever to play live.

Line-ups and The Neo-Progressive movement
Mach One were one of a small number of British bands formed during the early 1980s, including Marillion, Pendragon, IQ, Twelfth Night, Pallas and Janysium, that was associated with the Progressive Rock revival of that decade, often referred to as the "Neo Progressive Rock Movement".  However, the initial Mach One lineup founded by brothers Tim and Geoff Sprackling was more aligned with a straightforward rock style, with influences by the likes of Jimi Hendrix, Deep Purple and Led Zeppelin.  When founding members of Janysium, Peter Matuchniak and Simon Strevens were brought in on guitar and drums, they helped reshape the sound with their combined influences Genesis, Pink Floyd and Yes.

The final lineup changes introduced yet more influences such as David Bowie and Bauhaus from new singer Steve Fisher, and the styles of blues and funk from bassist Jon Bankes.  The overall effect of these varied influences appeared to cause consternation amongst some of the more traditional progressive rock fans.

Band members

1985 line-up
 Tim Sprackling – keyboards
 Geoff Sprackling – lead guitar, rhythm guitar, bass
 Peter Matuchniak – rhythm and lead guitar, bass, backing vocals

1983-84 line-up
 Tim Sprackling – keyboards
 Geoff Sprackling – lead guitar
 Peter Matuchniak – rhythm guitar
 Simon Strevens – drums, backing vocals
 Steve Fisher – lead vocals
 Jon Bankes – bass, backing vocals

1981-82 line-up
 Tim Sprackling – keyboards
 Geoff Sprackling – lead guitar
 Peter Matuchniak – rhythm guitar
 Simon Strevens – drums, lead vocals
 Martin Polley – bass

1980 line-up
 Tim Sprackling – keyboards
 Geoff Sprackling – lead guitar
 Martin Polley – bass
 Dave Polley – drums
 Steve Whalley – rhythm guitar, lead vocals

Discography

Albums
 Studio Sessions (cassette) (1982)
 Six of One (cassette) (1983)
 Lost for Words (LP) (1984) (distributed via Pinnacle Records
 Could This Have Been Our Prehistory (CD) (1985) (pending release)

Compilations
 An Ancient Lie (CD) (2000) (compilation from 1981–1984)

References

Bibliography
 Lucky, Jerry. The Progressive Rock Files. Burlington, Ontario: Collector's Guide Publishing, Inc (1998), 304 pages,  (paperback). Gives an overview of progressive rock's history as well as histories of the major and underground bands in the genre.  Mentions the release of Mach One's LP Lost for Words in the 1983-84 chapter.

External links
Official Mach One MySpace page
Official Janysium MySpace page
DPRP review
ProGGnosis review
Jerry Lucky review of Evolve IV which mentions Mach One
Jerry Lucky interviews

British progressive rock groups
Musical groups established in 1983